Capitán Miranda (ROU 20) is a three-masted staysail schooner of the Uruguayan Navy. Originally acquired by the Uruguayan Navy as a survey ship in 1930, the ship remained in service until 1976 in this role. Destined for the shipbreakers, the vessel was repurposed as a training ship in 1978.

Ship history
Capitán Miranda was ordered in January 1930 from the Spanish Sociedad Española de Construcción Naval shipyard at Cádiz. The vessel was laid down on 3 March and launched on 27 July 1930. She was named after Captain Francisco Prudencio Miranda (1868–1925), Uruguayan naval officer and marine geographer.

Sea trials were completed on 19 November 1930, and on 21 November Capitán Miranda was delivered to the Uruguayan Navy. She served as a survey ship, charting the coasts and waters of Uruguay until 1976. She was then due to be scrapped, but instead was converted into a three-masted schooner. The conversion was completed by 20 October 1978, when she began in her new role as a training ship. Capitan Miranda has since participated in numerous international tall ship regattas.

Gallery

References

External links

 Capitan Miranda official site

Schooners
Ships of the National Navy of Uruguay
Sail training ships
1930 ships
Ships built in Spain
Survey ships